Monte Rama is a mountain in Liguria, northern Italy, part of the Ligurian Apennines.

Geography 

The mountain is located in the province of Genova, in Liguria, and belongs to the municipality of Cogoleto. It stands on a brief ridge which, starting from the main chain of the Apennines near Rocca del Lago, heads south-east towards the Ligurian Sea and after Cima Fontanaccia reaches the Monte Rama.

Access to the summit 
Monte Rama summit can be reached from Sant'Anna Chapel (near Lerca of Cogoleto) following a signposted foothpath with a walk of around 2.30 hours.

Nature conservation 
The mountain is included in the Parco naturale regionale del Beigua.

References

Mountains of Liguria
One-thousanders of Italy
Mountains of the Apennines